Toomas Tohver (born 24 April 1973) is a retired Estonian international football goalkeeper, with 24 caps to his name. Tohver started his professional career at Flora Tallinn and had two spells abroad, first in Sweden and then in Norway.

External links
 
 Tulevik Viljandi profile

1973 births
Living people
FC Flora players
Viljandi JK Tulevik players
JK Tarvas Rakvere players
Hønefoss BK players
Estonian footballers
Estonia international footballers
Estonian expatriate footballers
Expatriate footballers in Norway
Estonian expatriate sportspeople in Norway
Expatriate footballers in Sweden
Estonian expatriate sportspeople in Sweden
Sportspeople from Pärnu
Association football goalkeepers